Kanan Devi (22 April 1916 – 17 July 1992) was an Indian actress and singer. She was among the early singing stars of Indian cinema, and is credited popularly as the first star of Bengali cinema. Her singing style, usually in rapid tempo, was used instrumentally in some of the biggest hits of New Theatres, Kolkata.

Biography
Kanan was born on 22 April 1916 in Howrah, West Bengal. In her autobiography, entitled "Sabaray Ami Nami", Kanan has observed that those she considered as her parents were Ratan Chandra Das and Rajobala, who lived together. After the death of her adoptive father, Ratan Chandra Das, young Kanan and Rajobala were simply left to fend for themselves. Her life story is a true tale of rags to riches. Some say she did her schooling (not completed) from Howrah's St. Agnes' Convent School.

A well wisher, Tulsi Banerji, whom she called Kaka babu, introduced Kanan when she was only ten to Madan Theatres/Jyoti Studios, where she was cast in a small role in Jaidev (1926), followed by Shankaracharya in 1927. She was known as Kanan Bala.

Kanan did at least five films with Madan Theatres productions, (1926–1932) Rishir Prem (1931), Jorebarat (1931), Vishnu Maya (1932) and Prahlad, playing even male leads in the last two.

She then worked with Radha Films from 1933 to 1936, then with New Theatres from 1937 to 1941, with MP Productions 1942 to 1948 and finally set up her own label Shrimati Pictures, 1949 to 1965.

From silent film roles as a child artist, Kanan made the successful transition into talkie films and was noticed with Jorebarat (1931), Manomoyee Girls School, Khooni Kaun and Maa (1934).

Her films with Jyotish Bannerjee included Joydev (1926), Rishir Prem (1931), Jorebarat (1931), Vishnumaya (1932), Kantahaar (1935) and Manomoyee Girls School (1935). Her films with Prafulla Ghosh were Sree Gouranga (1933), Char Darvesh (1933), Maa (1934) and Hari Bhakti. Others with Radha Film Company were Kanthahar (1935), Krishna Sudama (1936), Bishabriksha (1936) and Char Darvesh (1933).

New Theatres's P.C. Barua wanted her to play the lead in his Devdas (1935), but, due to contractual reasons with Radha, she could not act in the film, a factor she regretted all her life.

The films of New Theatres, owned by Biren Sircar, established her as a superhit singer and her films ran to packed audiences. She had to travel under constant protection, given her huge fan following. During her years with New Theatres, Calcutta from 1937, she played the lead in Barua's Mukti (1937), which was perhaps her finest performance, making her the studio's top star.  Apart from Mukti, she did Vidyapati, Saathi (1938), Street Singer (1938), Sapera (1939), Jawani Ki Reet (1939), Parajay (1939), Abhinetri (1940), Lagan (1941), Parichay (1941) and Jawab (1942). She became known as Kanan Devi from this point.

She came in contact with the music maestro Rai Chand Boral, who not only coached and familiarized her in the Hindi accent, but experimented with many classical Western and Indian forms in his music.  She received her initial musical training under Alla Rakha. She was employed as a singer at the Megaphone Gramaphone Company, receiving further training under Bhishmadev Chatterjee. She later learnt Rabindra Sangeet under Anadi Dastidar.  Kanan  remained the top star of New Theatres until she resigned her contract in 1941 and began to freelance in Bengali and Hindi films.

She worked with the biggest names in Indian cinema with K. L. Saigal, Pankaj Mullick, Pramathesh Ch Barua (P.C. Barua,  maker of film Devdas), Pahari Sanyal, Chabi Biswas and Ashok Kumar.

M.P. Productions's Jawaab was perhaps her biggest hit. Her song Duniya Yeh Duniya, Hai Toofan Mail was well received. She repeated the same feat in Hospital (1943), Banphool (1945) and Rajlakshmi (1946). Kanan Devi's last Hindi film was Chandrashekhar (1948), with Ashok Kumar.

Kanan turned producer with Shrimati Pictures in 1949 and later launched the Sabyasachi Collective with the film Ananya (1949). Her own productions were mainly based on the stories of Sharat Chandra Chattopadhyay.

Kanan married Ashok Maitra in December 1940. He was the son of the staunch Brahmo Samaj educationist Heramba Chandra Maitra. Despite their best intentions, the marriage could not withstand the severe condemnation by the then conservative society. Even the poet Rabindranath Tagore, who sent a token gift to the married couple received scathing criticism for blessing the couple. The main issue was that Kanan was not expected to be working in films after her marriage.  She filed for divorce in 1945. Despite the pain of the divorce, Kanan expressed her immense gratitude towards her first husband for giving her social recognition through marriage for the first time in her life. To Kanan's credit, she maintained excellent relations with Rani Mahanalobis, sister to Ashok Maitra and her husband, the famous social scientist P.C. Mahanalobis and with Kusumkumari Devi, Ashok Maitra's mother, even after the marriage was severed.

Kanan married Haridas Bhattacharjee around 1949. Haridas Bhattacharjee was then ADC to the Governor of Bengal.  He eventually left the naval service to join Kanan in her filmmaking venture and became a competent director. While raising their son Siddharth in Calcutta, she also formed and worked as the president of Mahila Shilpi Mahal, an organization to help senior female artists and other charitable and community causes, including those for the betterment of Bengali cinema.

Kanan Devi, as the first lady of the Bengali screen, received many honours for her contribution to Indian cinema. An honorary degree from Vishwabharati, the Padma Shree in 1968 and the Dadasaheb Phalke Award in 1976.

She died on 17 July 1992 in Bellevue Clinic, Calcutta when she was around seventy-six years of age.

Honour

 1942-Won BFJA Award-Best Actress Award for Parichaya
 1943-Won BFJA Award-Best Actress Award for Shesh Uttar
She was awarded the Padma Shri Award in 1968.
She was awarded the Dadasaheb Phalke Award in 1976.
A postage stamp, bearing Kanan's likeness, was released to honour her by India's Ministry of State for Communication and Information Technology in February 2011.

Filmography

Actor

Playback singer

 Asha (1956) (playback singer)
 Debatra (1955) (playback singer)
 Naba Bidhan (1954) (playback singer)
 Darpachurna (1952) (playback singer)
 Mejdidi (1950) (playback singer)
 Ananya (1949) (playback singer)
 Anirban (1948) (playback singer)
 Bankalekha (1948) (playback singer) ... a.k.a. The Crooked Writing
 Faisla (1947) (playback singer)
 Chandrashekhar (1947) (playback singer)
 Arabian Nights (1946) (playback singer)
 Krishna Leela (1946) (playback singer) ... a.k.a. Radha Krishna Prem ... a.k.a. The Story of Lord Krishna
 Tum Aur Main (1946) (playback singer)
 Tumi Aar Aami (1946) (playback singer)
 Ban Phool (1945) (playback singer)
 Path Bendhe Dilo (1945) (playback singer)
 Rajlaxmi (1945) (playback singer)
 Bideshini (1944) (playback singer)
 Jogajog (1943) (playback singer)
 Jawab (1942) (playback singer) ... a.k.a. Shesh Uttar (India: Bengali title) ... a.k.a. The Last Reply
 Lagan (1941) (playback singer)
 Parichay (1941) (playback singer) ... a.k.a. Acquaintance ... a.k.a. Marriage
 Abhinetri (1940) (playback singer)
 Haar Jeet (1940) (playback singer)
 Jawani Ki Reet (1939) (playback singer)
 Parajay (1939) (playback singer)
 Sapera (1939) (playback singer) ... a.k.a. The Snake-Charmer (India: English title)
 Sapurey (1939) (playback singer) ... a.k.a. The Snake-Charmer (India: English title)
 Bidyapati (1937) (playback singer)
 Mukti (1937/I) (playback singer) ... a.k.a. Freedom ... a.k.a. The Liberation of the Soul
 Mukti (1937/II) (playback singer)
 Vidyapati (1937) (playback singer)
 Bishabriksha (1936) (playback singer) ... a.k.a. The Poison Tree
 Krishna Sudama (1936) (playback singer) ... a.k.a. Krishna and Sudama
 Manmoyee Girls School (1935) (playback singer)
 Maa (1934) (playback singer)
 Char Darvesh (1933) (playback singer) ... a.k.a. Merchant of Arabia (India: English title)
 Vishnumaya (1932) (playback singer) ... a.k.a. Doings of Lord Vishnu
 Jore Barat (1931) (playback singer)
 Prahlad (1931/I) (playback singer)

Producer
 Abhaya O Srikanta (1965) (producer)
 Indranath Srikanta O Annadadidi (1959) (producer)
 Rajlakshmi O Srikanta (1958) (producer)
 Andhare Alo (1957) (producer)
 Asha (1956) (producer)
 Debatra (1955) (producer)
 Naba Bidhan (1954) (producer)
 Darpachurna (1952) (producer)
 Mejdidi (1950) (producer)
 Ananya (1949) (producer)
 Bamuner Meye (1949) (producer)

References

External links

 
 

1916 births
People from Howrah
1992 deaths
Actresses in Bengali cinema
Dadasaheb Phalke Award recipients
Actresses in Hindi cinema
Indian women playback singers
Indian film actresses
20th-century Indian actresses
20th-century Indian singers
Singers from West Bengal
Actresses from West Bengal
20th-century Indian women singers
Women musicians from West Bengal